Pyrgotis is a genus of moths belonging to the subfamily Tortricinae of the family Tortricidae. This genus was first described by Edward Meyrick in 1881.

Species
Pyrgotis arcuata (Philpott, 1915)
Pyrgotis calligypsa (Meyrick, 1926)
Pyrgotis chrysomela (Meyrick, 1914)
Pyrgotis consentiens Philpott, 1916
Pyrgotis eudorana Meyrick, 1885
Pyrgotis humilis Philpott, 1930
Pyrgotis plagiatana (Walker, 1863)
Pyrgotis plinthoglypta Meyrick, 1892
Pyrgotis pyramidias Meyrick, 1901
Pyrgotis siderantha (Meyrick, 1905)
Pyrgotis transfixa (Meyrick, 1924)
Pyrgotis zygiana Meyrick, 1882

See also
List of Tortricidae genera

References

 , 2005, World Catalogue of Insects 5.

External links
tortricidae.com

Archipini
Tortricidae genera
Moths of New Zealand